Ophyx loxographa is a moth of the family Erebidae. It is found in Papua New Guinea.

References

Ophyx
Moths described in 1908
Moths of Papua New Guinea